Hateship, Loveship is an American drama film directed by Liza Johnson and written by Mark Poirier, based on the 2001 short story "Hateship, Friendship, Courtship, Loveship, Marriage" by Alice Munro. The film stars Kristen Wiig, Hailee Steinfeld, Guy Pearce, Jennifer Jason Leigh and Nick Nolte. It premiered at the 2013 Toronto International Film Festival on September 6, 2013.

Plot
Johanna Parry (Kristen Wiig) must move to a new town to begin work as a housekeeper for Mr. McCauley (Nick Nolte), an elderly man who needs help keeping house, and to be a caretaker for McCauley's granddaughter, Sabitha (Hailee Steinfeld). She meets Sabitha's father and McCauley's son-in-law, Ken (Guy Pearce), who does not live with Sabitha or McCauley, but instead resides in Chicago. Sabitha's best friend, Edith (Sami Gayle), tells Johanna (after Johanna asks where Sabitha's mother lives) that Ken's wife died several years ago. After inviting Johanna and Sabitha to dinner, Ken writes a friendly note to Johanna, which his daughter delivers. Johanna writes a response letter and Sabitha's friend Edith offers to take it to the post office and mail it. Instead, she intercepts the letter and, as a cruel joke, the two teenagers forge a love note from Ken, addressed to Johanna. Then they set up a fake email account for Ken (who does not have email). They impersonate him, responding to love emails from Johanna. "Ken" calls her "my only friend" but things may change when "Ken" asks Johanna to visit him in Chicago.

Cast 
 Kristen Wiig as Johanna Parry
 Hailee Steinfeld as Sabitha
 Guy Pearce as Ken
 Jennifer Jason Leigh as Chloe
 Nick Nolte as Mr. McCauley
 Sami Gayle as Edith
 Christine Lahti as Eileen
 Grant Case as Mover
 Casey Hendershot as Mover
 Brett Roedel as Jason
 Brian Roedel as Justin
 Joel K. Berger as Stevie

Production

Filming 
The shooting of the film, originally titled Hateship, Friendship, began in November 2012 in New Orleans, Louisiana. The film was shot with Arri Alexa digital cameras and Kowa anamorphic lenses. Michael Benaroya is financing the film.

Reception 

On review aggregator website Rotten Tomatoes, the film holds an approval rating of 50% based on 54 reviews, with an average rating of 5.97/10. The site's critics consensus reads, "Kristen Wiig's vibrant performance is almost worth the price of admission -- and it has to be, because Hateship Loveship doesn't have much else going for it." At Metacritic, the film has a weighted average score of 59 out of 100, based on 21 critics, indicating "mixed or average reviews".

References

External links 

 
 
 
 
 
 

2013 films
American drama films
Films based on works by Alice Munro
Films shot in New Orleans
Films based on short fiction
2013 drama films
Films directed by Liza Johnson
2010s English-language films
2010s American films